"Love of My Life" is a song by the British rock band Queen from their 1975 album A Night at the Opera. The song is a sentimental ballad, notably featuring a harp played by Brian May.

After Queen performed the song in South America in 1981, the version from their live album Live Killers reached number 1 in the singles chart in Argentina and Brazil, and stayed in the charts in both countries for an entire year.

Mercury wrote it on the piano and guitar first, and May rearranged the song for acoustic 12-string guitar for live performances, also lowering the key by a minor third. May contributed occasional guitar phrases to the original recording and played the swooping harp glissandos by pasting together multiple takes of single chords.

Background
Queen spent a month during the summer of 1975 rehearsing in a barn at what would become Ridge Farm Studio in Surrey. The group then had a three-week writing and rehearsing session in July in a rented house near Kington, Herefordshire before recording began. From August to September 1975 they began to record the song at Rockfield Studios in Monmouthshire.

Live performances

Introduced during the News of the World Tour in 1977, "Love of My Life" was such a concert favourite that Mercury would stop singing and would conduct the audience as they took over. It was especially well received during concerts in South America, and as a result, the band released the Live Killers version of the song as a single there.

A live performance of the song appears in Queen at Wembley from 1986 where again Mercury conducts the audience as they sing the song. After Mercury's death, Brian May has frequently dedicated the song to him in his own live performances. A notable exception is the Sheffield show which yielded the Return of the Champions CD and DVD. At that show, May announced that Mercury's mother was at the show and he dedicated the song to her instead. In the Queen + Paul Rodgers Tour, May would sing a few lines of the song, then let the audience take over for every verse, as Mercury did. When played at the Glasgow SECC in the 2008 Cosmos Rocks tour, May dedicated the song to his own mother, who had recently died.

During Rock in Rio 6 in 2015, Queen + Adam Lambert was one of the artists to celebrate the festival's 30th anniversary. "Love of My Life" had both May singing a few lines and archive footage of Mercury performing the song during the inaugural Wembley concert  in 1986.

1979 live single release

The acoustic version of the song featured on the band's 1979 album Live Killers was recorded at their concert at Festhalle Frankfurt on 2 February of that year. A shortened version was released as a single in the UK and other territories, which did not include the spoken intros and outros from the album. The liner notes for the DVD release Greatest Video Hits 1 state that although the live audio is from Frankfurt, the accompanying music video that was edited to the track consisted of footage from a 1979 Tokyo concert. In fact, the footage was filmed before one of three Tokyo concerts the band played between 23–25 April. Some bits of footage from two concerts in Paris from earlier in the year are woven in. After performing the song in South America in 1981, it was this version that reached number 1 in the singles chart in Argentina and Brazil, and stayed in the charts in both nations for an entire year.

Personnel
Original studio version
Freddie Mercury – lead and backing vocals, piano
Brian May – acoustic and electric guitar, harp
Roger Taylor – drums, cymbals
John Deacon – bass guitar

1979 live version
Freddie Mercury – vocals
Brian May – acoustic guitar

Charts

Year-end charts

Certifications

References

External links
 Official YouTube videos: original music video, Live at The Bowl, Queen + Paul Rodgers (Live)
 Lyrics at Queen official website

1975 songs
1979 singles
Queen (band) songs
Scorpions (band) songs
Songs written by Freddie Mercury
1970s ballads
British soft rock songs
EMI Records singles
Parlophone singles
Elektra Records singles
Hollywood Records singles